Dalvaban-e Olya (also Romanized as Dalvābān-e ‘Olyā; also known as Dalvābān and Delqābān) is a village in Rudkhaneh Bar Rural District, Rudkhaneh District, Rudan County, Hormozgan Province, Iran. At the 2006 census, its population was 252, in 47 families.

References 

Populated places in Rudan County